Melissa Morales (born 4 December 1990) is a Guatemalan tennis player.

On 12 November 2018, Morales reached her best singles ranking of world No. 784. On 24 September 2018, she peaked at No. 608 in the doubles rankings.

Since her debut for the Guatemala Fed Cup team in 2008, Morales has a win–loss record of 24–12 as of March 2023.

ITF finals

Singles: 1 (runner–up)

Doubles: 8 (3 titles, 5 runner–ups)

Fed Cup participation

Singles

Doubles

References

External links
 
 
 

1990 births
Living people
Guatemalan female tennis players
Central American and Caribbean Games bronze medalists for Guatemala
Competitors at the 2014 Central American and Caribbean Games
Tennis players at the 2019 Pan American Games
Central American and Caribbean Games medalists in tennis
Tennis players at the 2007 Pan American Games
Pan American Games competitors for Guatemala
20th-century Guatemalan women
21st-century Guatemalan women